The Honda Domani is a car made by Honda and marketed in east Asia, including Japan. The car was mutually developed during Rover's collaboration with Honda. It was introduced in November 1992, replacing the Concerto in Honda's lineup, although that model lasted until 1995 in Europe. 

The Domani was another example of Honda taking one product and selling multiple versions at different dealership sales channels in Japan, called Honda Clio for the more upscale Domani, Honda Integra SJ at Honda Verno locations from 1996 to 2000. 

This was while Honda Primo sold the mechanically identical but aesthetically different Civic Ferio, along with the Civic three and five door hatchbacks. "Domani" is Italian for "tomorrow". In Japan, the Domani was also rebadged as the Isuzu Gemini.

First generation: MA4-7 (1992–1997) 

It is mechanically identical to the early 1990s version of the Honda Civic (chassis code EG) and production ended in 1997. The Domani sedan had 1.6-liter and 1.8-liter engines at first (from 1992 to 1997), then a 1.5-liter gasoline engine onwards from 1994. It was offered as a four door sedan only, in Ri, Vi, Si, Si G and Ri F trims. The Si and Si G had the 1.8-liter engine installed.

In Europe, five-door hatchback and wagon variants were available, replacing the Concerto sedan and five-door hatchback. The United Kingdom received two VTi trims of the Domani ("Civic"), chassis codes MB6 (five-door hatch) and MC2 (five-door estate) with the 1.8-litre DOHC VTEC B18C4 4-cylinder engine. They were sold there as the Honda Civic. 

The version for Japan also was available with Honda's Real-Time Four Wheel Drive System, especially on RiF models.

The Honda Domani has a very close relative in the saloon of the Rover 400, with which it shared virtually all its main components. Renamed the Rover 45 when facelifted in the end of 1999, it was also sold as the MG ZS from August 2001. The Rover/MG derivatives were produced, with numerous facelifts, until the Rover Group went into administration in April 2005, by which time the design was thirteen years old.

Second generation: MB3-5 (1997–2000) 

The second generation was introduced on January 31, 1997. It was based on the EK Civic.

A version for the market of Canada of the second generation Domani was built alongside the Civic in Alliston, Ontario, called the Acura 1.6 EL. This car was also exported back to Japan and Taiwan as the Honda Domani. In Japan, the Domani was replaced by the Honda Fit Aria as the compact sedan at Honda Clio dealerships for the model year of 2002. In 2006, the EL is replaced by the Acura CSX in Canada.

External links

 Honda Domani Manual

Front-wheel-drive vehicles
Domani
Honda Domani